The Nordic Medical Prize (Swedish Nordiska medicinpriset) is a Swedish prize in medicine awarded by the SalusAnsvar/Ulf Nilsonnes Foundation for Medical Research in cooperation with the insurance company Folksam. It is the second largest medical award in the Nordic countries, after the Nobel Prize in Medicine, and includes a monetary prize of one million Swedish kronor. The prize has been awarded since 1998.

Recipients 
 1998 – Lars Wallentin
 1999 – Björn Rydevik
 2000 – Jörgen Engel
 2002 – Anne-Lise Børresen-Dale
 2003 – Rikard Holmdahl and Andrej Tarkowski
 2004 – Ulf Lerner and Jukka H. Meurman
 2005 – Peter Arner
 2006 – Claes Ohlsson and Kalervo Väänänen
 2007 – Thomas Sandström
 2010 – Markku Kaste, Perttu J. Lindsberg and Turgut Tatlisumak
 2012 – Ola Didrik Saugstad
 2013 – Eija Kalso and Eva Kosek
 2014 – Erkki Isometsä and Gerhard Andersson
 2015 – Lars Engelbretsen, Roald Bahr, Jón Karlsson and Michael Kjær
 2016 – Heikki Joensuu and Lisa Rydén, Henrik Grönberg and Jonas Hugosson
 2017 – Gunhild Waldemar and Kaj Blennow
 2018 – Juleen R. Zierath and Patrik Rorsman

See also

 List of medicine awards

References 

Medicine awards
Swedish awards